The Dhaka Division cricket team is a Bangladeshi first-class team representing the Dhaka Division, one of the seven administrative regions in Bangladesh. The team competes in the National Cricket League. They play most of their home games at the Dhanmondi Cricket Stadium in Dhaka.The equivalent team in the Bangladesh Premier League (BPL) is the Dhaka Dynamites.

Honours
 National Cricket League (5) – 2001–02, 2003–04, 2004–05, 2006–07, 2013–14
 One-Day Cricket League (2) – 2006–07, 2009–10

National Cricket League record
Dhaka Division is one of the eight teams (formerly six) in the first-class National Cricket League of Bangladesh.

References 
 Wisden Cricketers' Almanack (annual)

Notes and references

External links
 CricketArchive re Bangladesh
 CricInfo re Bangladesh

Bangladeshi first-class cricket teams
Sport in Dhaka Division
Bangladesh National Cricket League
1999 establishments in Bangladesh
Cricket clubs established in 1999